The following is a list of recurring Saturday Night Live characters and sketches introduced between September 18, 1976, and May 21, 1977, the second season of SNL.

Mr. Mike's Least-Loved Bedtime Tales
Michael O'Donoghue would tell children's bedtime stories with increasingly horrific, nightmarish twists. Debuted October 30, 1976.

Consumer Probe / On The Spot
In each appearance of this sketch, the moderator of the show would interrogate toy maker Irwin Mainway, played by Dan Aykroyd, while he defended his company's extremely dangerous products aimed at children.  Toys included "Bag O' Glass", "Bag O' Vipers", "Bag O' Sulfuric Acid", "Mr. Skin Grafter", "Pretty Peggy's Ear Piercing Kit", "Doggy Dentist", "General Tranh's Secret Police Confession Kit", "Johnny Switchblade Adventure Punk", and "Teddy Chainsaw Bear". Halloween costumes included: a military outfit that included an actual working rifle ("very popular in Texas and Detroit!"); an entirely black and non-reflective uniform called "Invisible Pedestrian" (which had a warning on the package that read "NOT FOR BLIND KIDS"); an airtight plastic bag that was to be affixed over the head with a rubber band called "Johnny Space Commander Mask"; and an oil-soaked costume called "Johnny Human Torch", which came complete with an oversized lighter.

The first host of "Consumer Probe" was Candice Bergen (her character had no name), and then in four subsequent episodes, "Consumer Probe" (twice entitled "On The Spot") was hosted by Joan Face. Debuted December 11, 1976.

Appearances

Reception
The sketch was named the 8th best sketch by The 50 Best Sketches of All Time by nerve.com the third highest ranking sketch on Saturday Night Live after Coneheads at Home and Samurai Hotel.

Irwin Mainway
A Dan Aykroyd character, this maker of dangerous toys was repeatedly interrogated by the hosts of "Consumer Probe" and "On The Spot" during seasons two, three, and four.

Aykroyd would later appear as Mainway on an episode of the 90s sketch Bill Swerski's Superfans, presenting Michael Jordan merchandising which was also dangerous. Mainway was revealed in this sketch to be a cousin of Todd O'Conner, Chris Farley's character. He would also appear in a Judge Judy sketch.

Coneheads

Dan Aykroyd, Jane Curtin, and Laraine Newman are a family of aliens stranded on Earth. Debuted January 15, 1977.

Appearances

E. Buzz Miller and Christie Christina
Sleazy public-access television cable TV host E. Buzz Miller (Dan Aykroyd) made crude and lascivious remarks about otherwise commonplace subjects (such as fine art or exercise) to which his ditzy co-host Miss Christie Christina (Laraine Newman) would giggle and make obtuse responses. Debuted January 22, 1977.

Christie appeared once outside the cable TV show, in the Season 5, Episode 15 sketch "Assertiveness Training".

Rhonda Weiss
A Gilda Radner character from Long Island, coined as the "Jewish-American Princess". Debuted January 29, 1977.

Leonard Pinth-Garnell, host of "Bad Performances"
Leonard Pinth-Garnell was a recurring character played by Dan Aykroyd. Pinth-Garnell, always clad in a tuxedo and black tie, would lugubriously introduce a short performance of "Bad Conceptual Theater", "Bad Playhouse", "Bad Cinema", "Bad Opera", "Bad Ballet", "Bad Red Chinese Ballet", or "Bad Cabaret for Children", and then exult in its sheer awfulness. Aykroyd played the character nine times from 1977 through 1979, and returned for a single appearance on November 3, 2001, introducing "Bad Conceptual Theater." (The show was hosted at least one time by Laraine Newman as Lady Pinth-Garnell.) Debuted March 12, 1977.

Pinth-Garnell was loosely based on the longtime PBS Masterpiece Theatre host Alistair Cooke.

Memorable quotations
"Stunningly bad!"
"Monumentally ill-advised!"
"Perfectly awful!"
"Couldn't be worse!"
"Exquisitely awful!"
"Astonishingly ill-chosen!"
"Really bit the big one!"
"Unrelentingly bad!"
"Rally socks!"
"There... That wasn't so good now, was it?"

Episodes featuring Leonard Pinth-Garnell

Nick The Lounge Singer
Nick The Lounge Singer was one of Bill Murray's most popular recurring characters during his tenure on SNL. The character was a typical 1970s lounge singer who sang current songs in a drawn-out, schmaltzy manner, and was typically accompanied by Paul Shaffer on piano. Nick always had a different 'seasonal' last name (i.e. Nick Summers, Nick Springs, etc.) or sometimes a surname more specific to the sketch (for instance, if he were performing at a prison, he would be "Nick Slammer") and, although he would perform at such unfortunate gigs as airport bars and dives, he would always sing his heart out. He would often take the popular songs of the time and change some of the lyrics to suit the occasion or the setting. In between songs, Nick would schmooze and joke with the audience, chiding them in a harmless showbiz fashion. In one episode, he spotted Linda Ronstadt (that episode's musical guest) in the audience and proceeded to sing a very uncomfortable and unamused Ronstadt a medley of her hits until her bodyguard (played by John Belushi) finally punches him.

In probably his most famous appearance, he sang the theme from Star Wars, adding his own lyrics ("Star Wars/Nothing but Star Wars/Give me those Star Wars/Don't let them end!") to the famous John Williams piece.

Nearly two decades after Nick debuted on SNL, a recurring skit called The Culp Family Musical Performances featuring Will Ferrell and Ana Gasteyer would gain popularity using the same basic format.

Appearances

Additional Appearances
 Nick at the Casino September 26, 1999 (25th Anniversary Special)
 Nick sings "Jaws" February 15, 2015 (40th Anniversary Special)

Debbie Doody
Debbie Doody, played by Gilda Radner, is the widow of Howdy Doody, complete with strings attached to her arms. Debuted April 16, 1977.

Shower Mike with Richard Herkiman
Bill Murray plays Richard Herkiman, who at first appears to be taking his routine morning shower and imagining he is hosting a TV talk show. It soon becomes apparent that the TV program is real, as his TV "guests" enter the shower with him fully clothed. Debuted May 21, 1977.

References

Lists of recurring Saturday Night Live characters and sketches
Saturday Night Live in the 1970s
Saturday Night Live
Saturday Night Live